The Shenandoah Hornets are the athletic teams that represent Shenandoah University, located in Winchester, Virginia, in intercollegiate sports as a member of the Division III of the National Collegiate Athletic Association (NCAA), primarily competing in the Old Dominion Athletic Conference (ODAC) since the 2012–13 academic year. The Hornets previously competed in the USA South Athletic Conference (USA South) from 1992–93 to 2011–12.

Varsity teams
Shenandoah competes in 22 intercollegiate varsity sports: Men's sports include baseball, basketball, cross country, football, golf, lacrosse, soccer, tennis, track & field (indoor and outdoor) and wrestling; while women's sports include basketball, cross country, field hockey, golf, lacrosse, soccer, softball, tennis, track & field (indoor and outdoor) and volleyball.

Men's Programs

Baseball Championships 
 After a 33–5 record following the 2009 USA South Tournament, Shenandoah earned an at large bid to the NCAA Regional Tournament, a first for the program. SU won the region and went on to the NCAA Championships in Grand Chute, Wis. and eliminated after going 1–2 in the double elimination format.
 In 2010, Shenandoah defeated Christopher Newport 19-5 and 7–4 in the USA South Championships, earning an automatic bid to NCAA Regionals for the second year in a row. After winning the region, SU advanced to the championships but was eliminated after losing the first two games. 
 For the third year in a row, the Hornets earned a bid to the 2011 NCAA Regional Tournament. Salisbury defeated Shenandoah twice in the Championship to eliminate SU. 
 In 2012, the Hornets went 29-11 and earned a fourth straight bid to the NCAA Regional Tournament. SU went 2-2 during regional tournament play before being eliminated by Christopher Newport.
 After winning the 2014 regular season title, the Hornets were eliminated in game 11 of the Old Dominion Athletic Conference Baseball Championships but earned an at-large bid to the NCAA regionals and eliminated out of contention after four games by Emory. 
 The Hornets won the 2015 ODAC Baseball Tournament, earning an automatic bid to NCAA Regionals, SU went 1-2 before being eliminated by Frostburg State. 
 In 2016, Shenandoah earned an at-large bid to the NCAA regional baseball tournament, the Hornets were eliminated by Emory after going 3–2.
 During the 2017 post-season, Shenandoah lost in game nine of the ODAC Tournament but earned an at-large bid to the NCAA Regional Tournament. The Hornets went 5-2 before losing to Wheaton in the NCAA Regional Championship game. 
 Shenandoah defeated Roanoke in the ODAC Championship 8–4 to earn an automatic bid to the NCAA Regional Tournament. SU went 1–2 in the regional tournament before being eliminated by Ithaca College.

NCAA Appearances

Football Championship
 Shenandoah's football team were co-champions of the USA South twice, both times with (Christopher Newport): 2003 and 2004. Additionally, Shenandoah has made one appearance in the NCAA Division III Football Championship, in 2004. However, the Hornets were defeated in the first round by Delaware Valley, 21–17.

NCAA Appearances

Women's Programs

Women's Basketball Championships 
The Shenandoah University Women's Basketball Program claimed its first ever ODAC Championship in 2019 after defeating 9th seed Bridgewater College 79–60 in the first round, top seeded Guilford College in the ODAC quarterfinals 52–49 in overtime, 4th seeded Randolph-Macon College 58–41 in the ODAC semifinals, and Washington & Lee University 63–53 in the ODAC championship. Shenandoah became the lowest seed to ever win the ODAC championship as the 8th seed in the tournament and they earned the ODAC's automatic bid to the first round of the NCAA Tournament. The 2022 team claimed the ODAC title by defeating 5th seeded Randolph College 63-57 in the quarterfinals, top seeded Washington & Lee 67-59 in the semifinals, and 2nd seeded Randolph-Macon College 56-43 in the ODAC championship.

NCAA Appearances

Field Hockey Championships 
The Shenandoah University Field Hockey Program captured its first ODAC Championship in the fall of 2016 after defeating Washington & Lee University. SU would earn an automatic bid the first round of the NCAA Tournament.

NCAA Appearances

Women's Lacrosse Championships 
The women's lacrosse team captured its first conference championship in the spring of 2005 after defeating Methodist 17–13 in the USA South Athletic Conference Championship match.

Women's Soccer Championships 
In the fall of 2011, the women's soccer team won the USA South Conference Championship for the first time in school history. The team also played in the first round of the NCAA tournament for the first time.

NCAA Appearances

Softball Championships
 In the spring of 2008, the women's softball team captured its first-ever USA South Athletic Conference regular-season championship in school history, finishing with a record of 30-12 (15-3 in conference).
 In the spring of 2011, the softball team won the USA South Athletic Conference Tournament Championship, the first in school history. SU defeated Christopher Newport University 4-1 and 4–2, earning an automatic bid into the NCAA Regional Tournament.

NCAA Appearances

Academic All-America List

Facilities

References

External links